Ian Pettersson (born 21 July 2002) is a Swedish football goalkeeper who plays for Hammarby TFF.

References

2002 births
Living people
Swedish footballers
Association football goalkeepers
Helsingborgs IF players
Hammarby Talang FF players
Allsvenskan players
Ettan Fotboll players